John David Bennett (8 May 1928 – 11 April 2005) was an English actor.

Early life 
Born in Beckenham, Kent to Alfred Bennett and Bessie Bennett (née Rudnidsky), he was educated at Bradfield College in Berkshire, then trained at the Central School of Speech and Drama, followed by a wide repertory theatre experience including Bromley, Bristol Old Vic, Dundee, the Edinburgh Festival and Watford before going to London's West End. He was Jewish.

Career 
Often cast as a villain, he had many roles on television including Market in Honey Lane, Porridge, Survivors, The Avengers, Strange Report, Bergerac, The Professionals and four episodes of The Saint.  He guest-starred in two Doctor Who serials, as General Finch in Invasion of the Dinosaurs (1974) and as the Chinese magician Li H'sen Chang in The Talons of Weng-Chiang (1977). He is also well remembered as Philip Bosinney in the BBC's adaptation of The Forsyte Saga (1967), but also appeared in over three hundred TV productions including God's Architect; Blake's 7; I, Claudius; Rome; Rosemary & Thyme; Saracen; Special Branch; Softly, Softly; Mulberry; Tales of the Unexpected and Anna Karenina. One of his last televised roles was in an episode of Jonathan Creek.

His film roles included The House That Dripped Blood (1970), The House in Nightmare Park (1973), The Fifth Element (1997), Charlotte Gray (2001) and Minority Report (2002). He also played an undercover detective in Victim, but the role was uncredited.

His theatre roles included Yasha in The Cherry Orchard and Henry Percy (Hotspur) in Henry IV, Part 1 both for John Gielgud, Exton in Richard II and Volscian Senator in Coriolanus (Almeida Theatre), Marley's Ghost in A Christmas Carol (Royal Shakespeare Company) and Uncle in Inner Voices (Royal National Theatre), as well as working extensively at the Royal Exchange, Manchester. He starred in many West End musicals including On Your Toes (Palace), Marilyn! (Adelphi), The Sound of Music (Apollo Victoria), The King and I (London Palladium), The Baker's Wife (Phoenix) and was nominated for an Olivier Award for Best Supporting Performance in a Musical for his performance as Louis Epstein in Jolson The Musical (Victoria Palace and Royal Alexandra Theatre, Toronto). His last stage role was as Conrad in Gates of Gold by Frank McGuinness with William Gaunt at the Finborough Theatre, London, in December 2004.

In radio, he had been a member of the BBC Drama Repertory Company, and his broadcast parts included roles in programmes that ranged from Shakespeare to Paul Temple.

Bennett was an enthusiastic amateur flier and an accomplished glider pilot. For many years he was a member of the RAF G.S.A (Gliding and Soaring Association) Centre at RAF Bicester in the 1970s. He flew alongside Warrant Officer Andy Gough (then Chief Flying Instructor) and was a part owner of a number of high performance gliders.

Selected filmography 

 Diplomatic Passport (1954) – André (uncredited)
 The Trials of Oscar Wilde (1960) – Marquis of Queensberry's Friend (uncredited)
 The Challenge (1960) – Spider
 A Taste of Money (1960) – Waiter
 The Curse of the Werewolf (1961) – Policeman (uncredited)
 Victim (1961) – Undercover Detective (uncredited)
 Postman's Knock (1962) – Pete
 The Barber of Stamford Hill (1962) - Mr Figg
 Crooks Anonymous (1962) – Thomas
 The Pirates of Blood River (1962) – Penal Colony Guard (uncredited)
 Lawrence of Arabia (1962) – Arab Sheik (uncredited)
 Kaleidoscope (1966) – Poker Player
 A Funny Thing Happened on the Way to the Forum (1966)
 The Syndicate (1968) – Dr. Singh
 The House That Dripped Blood (1971) – Detective Inspector Holloway
 Henry VIII and His Six Wives (1972) – Wriothesley
 The House in Nightmare Park (1973) – Patel
 Hitler: The Last Ten Days (1973) – Joseph Goebbels
 The Message (1976) – Salool
 The Greek Tycoon (1978) – Servant
 Watership Down (1978) – Capt. Holly (voice)
 The Mirror Crack'd (1980) – Barnsby ('Murder at Midnight')
 Eye of the Needle (1981) – Kleinmann
 The Plague Dogs (1982) – Don (voice)
 Give My Regards to Broad Street (1984) – Mr. Rath
 Tai-Pan (1986) – Orlov
 Hell Comes to Frogtown (1988) – Frog Guard
 Prisoner of Honor (1991) – Magistrate
 Sherlock Holmes and the Leading Lady (1991) – Dr. Sigmund Freud
 Split Second (1992) – Dr. Schulman
 Priest (1994) – Father Redstone
 The Fifth Element (1997) – Priest
 Bridge of Dragons (1999) – The Registrar
 Beginner's Luck (2001) – Old luvvie
 Charlotte Gray (2001) – Gerard
 The Pianist (2002) – Dr. Ehrlich
 Minority Report (2002) – Adulation #4

References

External links 
 
 
 Obituary in The Independent
 John Bennett at Theatricalia

1928 births
2005 deaths
Alumni of the Royal Central School of Speech and Drama
English male film actors
English male stage actors
English male television actors
English male voice actors
People educated at Bradfield College
People from Beckenham
Male actors from Kent
English Jews
Jewish English male actors